Radziwiłł Family Fee Tail (Polish: Ordynacja Radziwiłłów, Belarusian: Ардынацыя Радзівілаў) was a fee tail established in the Polish–Lithuanian Commonwealth and owned by the Radziwiłł family.

Three family fee tail estates were established on the basis of an agreement between the three sons of Mikołaj Czarny Radziwiłł on August 16, 1586 in Grodno. The "Nyasvizh Fee Tail" (Ordynacja Nieświeska, Нясвіжская ардынацыя), "Ołyka Fee Tail" (Ordynacja Ołycka) and "Kleck Fee Tail" (Ordynacja Klecka, Клецкая ардынацыя). It was approved by the Sejm in 1589. Ordynat was the title of the principal heir of the Ordynacja.

The family fee tail existed in partitioned Poland and the Second Republic of Poland until the end of World War II. The last ordynat was Prince Leon Władysław Radziwiłł (1888-1956).

Ortynats of the Estate

Nyasvizh Fee Tail (Ordynacja Nieświeska)
 Mikołaj Krzysztof "Sierotka" Radziwiłł, I ordynat
 Jan Jerzy Radziwiłł, II ordynat, son of the previous
 Albrecht Władysław Radziwiłł, III ordynat, son of the previous
 Zygmunt Karol Radziwiłł, IV ordynat, brother of the previous
 Aleksander Ludwik Radziwiłł, V ordynat, brother of the previous
 Michał Kazimierz Radziwiłł, VI ordynat, son of the previous
 Jerzy Józef Radziwiłł, VII ordynat, son of the previous
 Karol Stanisław Radziwiłł, VIII ordynat, brother of the previous
 Michał Kazimierz "Rybeńko" Radziwiłł, IX ordynat, son of the previous
 Karol Stanisław "Panie Kochanku" Radziwiłł, X ordynat, son of the previous
 Dominik Hieronim Radziwiłł, XI ordynat, nephew of the previous
 Antoni Henryk Radziwiłł, XII ordynat, distant cousin
 Wilhelm Radziwiłł, XIII ordynat, son of the previous
 Antoni Wilhelm Radziwiłł, XIV ordynat, son of the previous
 Jerzy Fryderyk Radziwiłł, XV ordynat, son of the previous
 Albrecht Antoni Wilhelm Radziwiłł, XVI ordynat, son of the previous
 Leon Władysław Radziwiłł, XVII ordynat, brother of the previous, the last ordynat

Kleck Fee Tail (Ordynacja Klecka)
 Albrecht Radziwiłł, I ordynat
 Jan Albrycht Radziwiłł, II ordynat, son of the previous
 Jan Władysław Radziwiłł, III ordynat, son of the previous
 Michał Karol Radziwiłł, IV ordynat, son of the previous
 Stanisław Kazimierz Radziwiłł, V ordynat, son of the previous
 Dominik Mikołaj Radziwiłł VI ordynat, distant cousin
 Jan Mikołaj Radziwiłł, VII ordynat, son of the previous
 Marcin Mikołaj Radziwiłł, VIII ordynat, son of the previous
 Józef Mikołaj Radziwiłł, IX ordynat, son of the previous
 Michał Hieronim Radziwiłł, X ordynat, son of the previous
 Ludwik Mikołaj Radziwiłł, XI ordynat, son of the previous
 Leon Radziwiłł, XII ordynat, son of the previous
 Jerzy Fryderyk Radziwiłł, XIII ordynat, cousin of the previous
 Albrecht Antoni Wilhelm Radziwiłł, XIV ordynat, son of the previous
 Leon Władysław Radziwiłł, XV ordynat, brother of the previous

Ołyka Fee Tail (Ordynacja Ołycka)
 Stanisław Radziwiłł, I ordynat
 Mikołaj Krzysztof Radziwiłł, II ordynat, son of the previous
 Albrecht Stanisław Radziwiłł, III ordynat, brother of the previous
 Michał Kazimierz Radziwiłł, IV ordynat, cousin of the previous
 Michał Kazimierz "Rybeńko" Radziwiłł, VII ordynat, son of the previous
 Karol Stanisław "Panie Kochanku" Radziwiłł, VIII ordynat, son of the previous
 Dominik Hieronim Radziwiłł, IX ordynat, nephew of the previous
 Antoni Henryk Radziwiłł, X ordynat, distant cousin
 Bogusław Fryderyk Radziwiłł, XI ordynat, son of the previous
 Ferdynand Radziwiłł, XII ordynat, son of the previous
 Janusz Franciszek Radziwiłł, XIII ordynat, son of the previous
 Edmund Ferdynand Radziwiłł, XIV ordynat, third son of the previous

See also
 Fee tail in the Polish–Lithuanian Commonwealth
 Przygodzice Radziwiłł Family Fee Tail
 Zamoyski Family Fee Tail

Bibliography
 T. Zielińska Ordynacje w dawnej Polsce, „Przegląd Historyczny” 1977 z. 1.

References

Radziwiłł family
Legal history of Poland
Economic history of Poland
Legal history of Belarus
Economic history of Belarus